Carex timida is a tussock-forming species of perennial sedge in the family Cyperaceae. It is native to central and eastern parts of the United States.

See also
List of Carex species

References

timida
Plants described in 2001
Flora of Arkansas
Flora of Alabama
Flora of Illinois
Flora of Missouri
Flora of Kentucky
Flora of Indiana
Flora of Ohio
Flora of Oklahoma
Flora of Tennessee